Sundsøre is a village in the former Sundsøre municipality, since 1 January 2007 it is a part of Skive Municipality, Central Denmark Region in Denmark.

Villages in Denmark
Populated places in Central Denmark Region
Skive Municipality